Roberts Ozols (born 10 September 1995) is a Latvian footballer who plays as a goalkeeper for Auda and the Latvia national team.

Career
In March 2023, Ozols signed for Auda after eight years with Riga.

Ozols made his international debut for Latvia on 7 October 2020 in a friendly match against Montenegro.

Career statistics

International

Honours

 Latvian First League: 2015
 Latvian Football Cup: 2018
 Latvian Higher League: 2018, 2019, 2020

References

External links
 
 

1995 births
Living people
People from Kuldīga
Latvian footballers
Latvia international footballers
Association football goalkeepers
FK Liepājas Metalurgs players
FK Spartaks Jūrmala players
FK Daugava (2003) players
Riga FC players
FK Auda players
Latvian Higher League players